Lowell Wallace "Chuck" Ramsey  (born February 24, 1952), is a former American football player, who was a punter with the New York Jets for eight seasons. Previously he played with the Chicago Fire of the World Football League.

During his time as a Jet in fact in his entire NFL career he averaged exactly 40 yards per punt and only had 4 punts blocked. He punted 553 times for 22,128 yards. He averaged 42.4 yards per punt in 1980 and his longest punt was 79 yards in his first full season, 1978.

References

1952 births
Living people
People from Rock Hill, South Carolina
American football punters
Wake Forest Demon Deacons football players
Chicago Fire (WFL) players
New York Jets players
Players of American football from South Carolina